Susan Allen (born March 27, 1963) is an American politician and former member of the Minnesota House of Representatives. A member of the Minnesota Democratic–Farmer–Labor Party (DFL), she represented District 62B, a southside district encompassing the Powderhorn and Bryant neighborhoods of Minneapolis. She was the first Native American woman to serve in the Minnesota Legislature and the first openly lesbian Native American to win election to a state legislature. She did not seek re-election in 2018.

Early life, education, and career
The daughter of an Episcopal priest, Allen graduated from Augsburg College in Minneapolis in 1992. She later earned a J.D. from the University of New Mexico Law School (1995) and an LL.M. from William Mitchell College of Law in St. Paul (1999). She became a practicing attorney in 1997 and a partner of her law firm in 2004.

Minnesota House of Representatives
Allen was one of four openly gay members, alongside Representatives Karen Clark and Erin Maye Quade and Senator Scott Dibble, in the Minnesota Legislature.

Elections
When state representative Jeff Hayden was elected to the Minnesota Senate in October 2011, he vacated his seat in the House of Representatives. Allen was one of four DFLers to put themselves forward for the seat and, at the DFL nominating convention held on November 12, she received the party's endorsement on the third ballot. She nevertheless faced a primary election on December 6, facing three opponents, two of whom had suspended their campaigns after losing at the convention. Allen won the nomination handily, taking over 82% of the vote in the primary. In the general election held on January 10, 2012, she faced only one opponent, who ran under the "Respect" label, beating him 56–43%.

She was re-elected in the 2012, 2014 and 2016 general elections. She did not seek re-election in 2018.

Personal life
As an attorney, Allen specializes in serving Indian tribes, helping them draft tribal laws in a wide range of areas. She is Lakota and a member of the Rosebud Sioux Tribe. She identifies as two-spirit.

References

External links

1963 births
20th-century American Episcopalians
20th-century Native Americans
21st-century American Episcopalians
21st-century American lawyers
21st-century American politicians
21st-century Native Americans
21st-century American women politicians
Augsburg University alumni
Living people
Lakota people
Lawyers from Minneapolis
Lesbian politicians
LGBT Anglicans
LGBT lawyers
LGBT Native Americans
LGBT people from Utah
LGBT state legislators in Minnesota
Democratic Party members of the Minnesota House of Representatives
Native American Episcopalians
Native American lawyers
Native American state legislators in Minnesota
Native American women in politics
Politicians from Minneapolis
University of New Mexico School of Law alumni
William Mitchell College of Law alumni
Women state legislators in Minnesota
21st-century American women lawyers
20th-century Native American women
21st-century Native American women
Two-spirit people
Rosebud Sioux people